Loch Lynn Heights is a town in Garrett County, Maryland, United States. The population was 493 at the 2020 census.

Geography
Loch Lynn Heights is located at  (39.391838, -79.373635).

1967 F3 tornado
On May 19, 1967, a tornado struck Loch Lynn Heights, causing one fatality and throwing a small frame house 100 yards. It was rated F3.

Demographics

2010 census
As of the census of 2010, there were 552 people, 203 households, and 157 families living in the town. The racial makeup of the town was 98.7% White, 0.2% African American, 0.2% from other races, and 0.9% from two or more races. Hispanic or Latino of any race were 0.4% of the population.

There were 203 households, of which 44.3% had children under the age of 18 living with them, 46.8% were married couples living together, 23.6% had a female householder with no husband present, 6.9% had a male householder with no wife present, and 22.7% were non-families. 19.2% of all households were made up of individuals, and 10.9% had someone living alone who was 65 years of age or older. The average household size was 2.72 and the average family size was 3.06.

The median age in the town was 32.8 years. 30.8% of residents were under the age of 18; 9.2% were between the ages of 18 and 24; 24.7% were from 25 to 44; 23.2% were from 45 to 64; and 12% were 65 years of age or older. The gender makeup of the town was 46.4% male and 53.6% female.

2000 census
As of the census of 2000, there were 469 people, 181 households, and 135 families living in the town. The racial makeup of the town was 99.36% White, 0.43% Asian, and 0.21% from two or more races.

There were 181 households, out of which 36.5% had children under the age of 18 living with them, 59.1% were married couples living together, 11.6% had a female householder with no husband present, and 25.4% were non-families. 21.5% of all households were made up of individuals, and 9.9% had someone living alone who was 65 years of age or older. The average household size was 2.59 and the average family size was 3.00.

In the town, the population was spread out, with 28.6% under the age of 18, 7.7% from 18 to 24, 27.5% from 25 to 44, 22.0% from 45 to 64, and 14.3% who were 65 years of age or older. The median age was 36 years. For every 100 females, there were 93.0 males. For every 100 females age 18 and over, there were 81.1 males.

The median income for a household in the town was $31,875, and the median income for a family was $34,375. Males had a median income of $21,563 versus $16,111 for females. The per capita income for the town was $12,369. About 14.7% of families and 16.2% of the population were below the poverty line, including 24.8% of those under age 18 and 11.2% of those age 65 or over.

Transportation

The main method of travel to and from Loch Lynn Heights at present is by road. The only state highway directly serving the town is Maryland Route 560, which head south to U.S. Route 50 in Gorman and north to Maryland Route 135 in Mountain Lake Park.

Government
The current  mayor is Carolyn S. Corley.

References

Towns in Maryland
Towns in Garrett County, Maryland